Nestor the Chronicler (1056 – c. 1114) was a monk who is the reputed author of Primary Chronicle (the earliest East Slavic letopis), Life of the Venerable Theodosius of the Kiev Caves and Account about the Life and Martyrdom of the Blessed Passion Bearers Boris and Gleb.

Biography 

In 1073 AD, Nestor became a monk of the Monastery of the Caves in Kiev. The only other detail of his life that is reliably known is that he was commissioned with two other monks to find the relics of St. Theodosius of Kiev, a mission which he fulfilled successfully. It is also speculated that he supported the reigning prince Svyatopolk II, and his pro-Slavic party disliked Greek influence in Kiev.

His chronicle begins with the Deluge, as did those of most Christian chroniclers of the time. The compiler appears to have been acquainted with the Byzantine historians; he makes use especially of John Malalas and George Hamartolus. He also likely had other Slavonic language chronicles to compile from, which have since been lost. Many legends are mistakenly attributed to Nestor's Chronicle; the style is occasionally so poetic that perhaps he incorporated bylinas that are now lost.

As an eyewitness, Nestor could only have described the reigns of Vsevolod I and Svyatopolk II (1078–1112), but it is surmised he could have gathered many details from older inhabitants. Two such possibilities are Giurata Rogovich of Novgorod, who could have provided him with information concerning the north of Kievan Rus', the Pechora River, and other places, as well as Yan Vyshatich, a nobleman who died in 1106 at the age of ninety. Nestor provided valuable ethnological details of various Slavic tribes.

The current theory about Nestor is that the Chronicle is a patchwork of many fragments of chronicles, and that the name of Nestor was attached to it because he either wrote the majority of it or was responsible for piecing all the fragments together. The name of the hegumen Sylvester is affixed to several of the manuscripts as the author.

St. Nestor died around 1114 and was buried in the Near Caves. He has been glorified (canonized) as a saint by the Eastern Orthodox Church. The body of the ancient chronicler may be seen among the relics preserved in the Kiev Pechersk Lavra. His feast day is celebrated on October 27. He is also commemorated in common with other saints of the Kiev Caves Lavra on September 28 (Synaxis of the Venerable Fathers of the Kiev Caves) and on the Second Sunday of Great Lent.

Veneration 
Nestor the Chronicler was canonized by including his name in the Synaxis of all Venerable Fathers of the Kiev Caves.

Feast Day 

 27 October – main commemoration, (with: Nestor of Thessaloniki and Nestor of the Far Kiev Caves)

Fixed Feast Day (Synaxes) 

 25 May – Synaxis of Saints of Volhynia (ROCOR and Greek Orthodox Church)
 15 July – Synaxis of All Saints of Kiev (ROC)
 28 September – Synaxis of the Venerable Fathers of the Kiev Near Caves
 10 October – Synaxis of Saints of Volhynia (ROC)
 27 October – Synaxis of All Saints of Kiev Theological Academy and Kiev Theological Seminary [Ukrainian Orthodox Church (Moscow Patriarchate)]

Moveable Feast Day (Synaxes) 

 Synaxis of all Venerable Fathers of the Kiev Caves – movable holiday on the 2nd Sunday of the Great Lent
 Synaxis of the Saints of the Kievan Caves Monastery, venerated in the near caves of Venerable Anthony – movable holiday on the 1st Saturday after Leavetaking of the Elevation of the Cross (21 September)

Liturgical hymns 

Troparion St. Nestor — Tone 4

Вели́ких князе́й ру́сских дея́ния/ и преподо́бных оте́ц Пече́рских жития́ и чудеса́ написа́вый,/ свое́ же, Богому́дре Не́сторе, мно́гих ти ра́ди доброде́телей и́мя/ напи́сано на Небеси́ стяжа́вый,// моли́ и нам написа́тися в Кни́ги Живо́тныя.

Velikikh knyazey russkikh deyaniya/ i prepodobnykh otets Pecherskikh zhitiya i chudesa napisavy,/ svoe zhe, Bogomudre Nestore, mnogikh ti radi dobrodeteley imya/ napisano na Nebesi styazhavy,// moli i nam napisatisya v Knigi Zhivotnyya.

Common Troparion St. Nestor — Tone 4

Времена́ и ле́та достопа́мятных дея́ний,/ по́двиги и труды́ Богоно́сных оте́ц,/ Не́сторе прему́дре, напису́я,/ любо́вию возгоре́лся еси́ после́довати стопа́м первонача́льных,/ с ни́миже не преста́й моли́тися Христу́ Бо́гу,// спасти́ся душа́м на́шим.

Vremena i leta dostopamyatnykh deyany,/ podvigi i trudy Bogonosnykh otets,/ Nestore premudre, napisuya,/ lyuboviyu vozgorelsya esi posledovati stopam pervonachalnykh,/ s nimizhe ne prestay molitisya Khristu Bogu,// spastisya dusham nashim.

Kontakion St. Nestor — Tone 2

Я́ко сый Богоно́снаго Феодо́сия учени́к/ и и́стинный жития́ того́ подража́тель,/ пе́рвый честны́х его́ моще́й самови́дец бы́ти сподо́бился еси́,/ я́же с про́чиими святоле́пно прене́с,/ насле́дил еси́ с те́миже Ца́рство Небе́сное,// е́же получи́ти и нам, чту́щим тя, Го́сподеви моли́ся.

Yako siy Bogonosnago Feodosiya uchenik/ i istinny zhitiya togo podrazhatel,/ pervy chestnykh ego moshchey samovidets byti spodobilsya esi,/ yazhe s prochiimi svyatolepno prenes,/ nasledil esi s temizhe Tsarstvo Nebesnoe,// ezhe poluchiti i nam, chtushchim tya, Gospodevi molisya.

Known works
 Life of the Venerable Theodosius of the Kiev Caves (1080s)
 (disputed) Primary Chronicle, or The Tale of Bygone Years (ca. 1113)
 Account about the Life and Martyrdom of the Blessed Passion Bearers Boris and Gleb (1080s)

See also
 Outline of Slavic history and culture

Notes

References

External links

Venerable Nestor the Chronicler of the Kiev Near Caves Orthodox icon and synaxarion
Visitor information for Kyiv Pechersk Lavra

Orthodox Christian Chroniclers
Eastern Orthodox monks from Ukraine
Ukrainian Christians
12th-century Eastern Orthodox Christians
12th-century Christian saints
12th-century historians
1050s births
1110s deaths
12th-century Christian monks